igHome is a customizable start page introduced in 2012 as an alternative to iGoogle, the personal web portal launched by Google in May 2005. Just like iGoogle, igHome offers users the possibility to build a start page containing a central search box and a number of gadgets. igHome mimics the user interface of iGoogle. Registered igHome users can create multiple tabs and import RSS feeds.

See also 
 Start page
 iGoogle
 Protopage

References

External links 
 igHome Official website

Web applications
Web portals